Hardy is a hamlet in The Gap Rural Municipality No. 39, Saskatchewan, Canada. The community had a population of 5 in 2001. It previously held the status of village until January 1, 2000. The hamlet is located 82 km south west of the City of Weyburn 10 km west of highway 6 and 5 km north of highway 705. Hardy was named for the great 19th-century English novelist and poet Thomas Hardy.

Demographics

Prior to January 1, 2000, Hardy was incorporated as a village, and was restructured as a hamlet under the jurisdiction of the Rural municipality of The Gap on that date.

See also

List of communities in Saskatchewan
Hamlets of Saskatchewan

References

Former villages in Saskatchewan
The Gap No. 39, Saskatchewan
Unincorporated communities in Saskatchewan
Populated places disestablished in 2000
Division No. 2, Saskatchewan